The 1989–90 Fulham RLFC season was the tenth in the club's history. They competed in the 1989–90 Second Division of the Rugby Football League. They also competed in the 1990 Challenge Cup, 1989–90 Lancashire Cup and the 1989–90 League Cup. They finished the season in 8th place in the second tier of British professional rugby league.

1989-90 squad

1989-90 Second Division Final Standings

References

External links
Rugby League Project

London Broncos seasons
London Broncos season
1989 in rugby league by club
1989 in English rugby league
London Broncos season
1990 in rugby league by club
1990 in English rugby league